Travis Ganong (born July 14, 1988) is an American World Cup alpine ski racer and specializes in the speed events of downhill and super-G. Born and raised in Truckee, California, he competed for the U.S. at the 2014 Winter Olympics in Sochi, and placed fifth in the downhill at Rosa Khutor, 0.41 seconds behind the winner.

Ganong gained his first World Cup victory on December 2014 in a downhill in Santa Caterina, Italy. At his third World Championships in 2015 at Beaver Creek, Colorado, he won the silver medal in the downhill.  Ganong injured his right knee (ACL) in late December 2017 at Bormio and missed the rest of the season, including the 

Ganong has been in a relationship with Canadian alpine racer Marie-Michèle Gagnon since 2008. The pair met through mutual friend Louis-Pierre Hélie. In 2014, the couple moved to a new home in Lake Tahoe, California.

World Cup results

Season standings

Race podiums
 2 wins – (2 DH)
 6 podiums – (5 DH, 1 SG); 46 top tens – (32 DH, 14 SG)

World Championship results

Olympic results

References

External links
 

 
 
 U.S. Ski Team – profile – Travis Ganong
 Atomic Skis – athletes – Travis Ganong
 Sochi 2014 – Travis Ganong
 

1988 births
American male alpine skiers
Alpine skiers at the 2014 Winter Olympics
Alpine skiers at the 2022 Winter Olympics
Olympic alpine skiers of the United States
People from Truckee, California
Living people
People from Olympic Valley, California